Khismatullin is a Tatar masculine surname, its feminine counterpart is Khismatullina. Notable people with the surname include:

Denis Khismatullin (born 1984), Russian chess grandmaster

Tatar-language surnames
Russian-language surnames